The fine-spotted mulch-skink (Glaphyromorphus punctulatus)  is a species of skink found in Queensland in Australia.

References

Glaphyromorphus
Reptiles described in 1871
Taxa named by Wilhelm Peters